Harbour Place Shopping Centre is a shopping centre located in Mullingar, County Westmeath, Ireland. The centre is anchored by Dunnes Stores, which is the largest store.

Development 
Permission was granted by Westmeath County Council for a shopping centre to be built beside Cusack Park. Development began in 1994 and the centre was completed a year and a half later opening in November 1995.

Sale
In November 2014, the shopping centre was auctioned for €50 million on behalf of the National Asset Management Agency (NAMA), along with the rest of 'The Harvest Portfolio' which included the Johnstown Shopping Centre in Navan, Cashel Town Shopping Centre, Thurles Shopping Centre and Dungarvan Shopping Centre.

Stores
Harbour Place contains many small outlets, such as Boots,  and a  "Talk to Me" store. All stores are located on the ground floor of the shopping centre. On the first floor, there are a radio studio, toilets and an Esquire's Coffee café.  In late January 2015, Golden Discs closed down unexpectedly with the loss of four jobs; the owners deemed the shopping centre location "no longer commercially viable".

References

Mullingar
Shopping centres in the Republic of Ireland